Duwayr al-Akrad ( transliteration: duwayr al-’akrād) is a Syrian village located in the Ziyarah Subdistrict of the al-Suqaylabiyah District in Hama Governorate. According to the Syria Central Bureau of Statistics (CBS), the village had a population of 814 in the 2004 census.

References 

Populated places in al-Suqaylabiyah District